Eugène Georges Joseph Lecrosnier (20 April 1923 − 15 October 2013) was a French Prelate of the Catholic Church.

Lecrosnier was born in Maupertuis, France, and was ordained a priest on 20 December 1947. He was appointed auxiliary bishop of the Archdiocese of Chambéry, as well as titular bishop of San Leone, on 21 April 1969 and ordained bishop on 21 June 1969. Lecrosnier was appointed to the Diocese of Belfort-Montbéliard on 5 November 1979 and would remain as bishop until his retirement on 1 March 2000.

References

External links
Catholic-Hierarchy
Chambéry Diocese  
 Saint-Dié Diocese 

20th-century Roman Catholic bishops in France
1923 births
2013 deaths